is a private university in the town of Kōryō in Nara Prefecture, Japan. The predecessor of the school was founded in 1946, and it was chartered as a university in 2003. The university has undergraduate and graduate programs in health sciences and education, as well as an advanced course in midwifery.

References

External links
 Official website 

Educational institutions established in 1946
Private universities and colleges in Japan
Universities and colleges in Nara Prefecture
1946 establishments in Japan